Evan Simpson (born February 11, 1957) is an American politician and a Republican former member of the Wyoming House of Representatives representing District 21 from his appointment on October 13, 2017 until January 10, 2023.

Elections

2017
Incumbent Republican Representative Robert McKim resigned on September 14, 2017, due to health reasons. Lincoln County Commissioners appointed Simpson to replace McKim and took office on October 13, 2017.

Personal life
Simpson is a member of the Church of Jesus Christ of Latter-day Saints.

References

External links
Official page at the Wyoming Legislature

1957 births
Living people
Republican Party members of the Wyoming House of Representatives
People from Afton, Wyoming
Engineers from Wyoming
21st-century American engineers
American civil engineers
21st-century American politicians
Latter Day Saints from Wyoming